Alamdevi  is a village development committee in Syangja District in the Gandaki Zone of central Nepal. At the time of the 2011 Nepal census it had a population of 3844 people living in 908 individual households. Alamdevi Temple appeared on the national stamps in 2019.

References

External links
UN map of the municipalities of Syangja District

Populated places in Syangja District